Robin Gubser (born 17 April 1991) is a Liechtensteiner footballer who last played for FC Mels.

International career
He was a member of the Liechtenstein national football team and holds 38 caps and has scored one goal, making his debut in a friendly against Poland on 4 June 2013.

International goals
Score and Result lists Liechtenstein's goal tally first

|-
| 1. || 28 March 2016 || Estadio Municipal de Marbella, Marbella, Spain ||  ||  ||  || Friendly || 
|}

References

1991 births
Living people
Liechtenstein footballers
Liechtenstein international footballers
FC Balzers players
USV Eschen/Mauren players
Association football midfielders